Interstate 22 (I-22) is a  Interstate Highway in the US states of Mississippi and Alabama, connecting I-269 near Byhalia, Mississippi, to I-65 near Birmingham, Alabama. I-22 is also Corridor X of the Appalachian Development Highway System (ADHS). Designated in 2012, I-22 follows the route of older US Route 78 (US 78) and is concurrent with the route for all but its eastern most . The freeway mainly spans rural areas and passes numerous small towns along its route, including Fulton, Tupelo, New Albany, and Holly Springs in Mississippi and Jasper, Winfield, and Hamilton in Alabama.

I-22 was upgraded to Interstate Highway standards to close a gap in the Interstate Highway System, allowing for more direct connections between cities in the southeast with cities in the central part of the country. I-22 indirectly connects I-240, I-40, I-55, and I-69 in the Memphis metropolitan area via US 78 and I-269 with I-65, I-459, I-20, and I-59 in the Birmingham metropolitan area.

Route description

|-
|
|
|-
|
|
|-
|Total
|
|}

I-22 serves as a connection between Birmingham and suburban Memphis, filling in a gap in the Interstate Highway System. It also fills a gap that provides freeway passage between Atlanta and Oklahoma City.

Mississippi

I-22 begins at a cloverleaf interchange with I-269 just west of Byhalia in DeSoto County northwestern Mississippi in the far southeastern suburbs of Memphis. It is concurrent with US 78, which is a four-lane freeway through its entire length in Mississippi and the exit numbers for its overlap with I-22 remain based on its mileage. I-22/US 78 then continues southeastward into Marshall County parallel to Mississippi Highway 178 (MS 178; the former alignment of US 78) with latter route providing local access to small towns along the route. The first major community the freeway passes is Holly Springs, the county seat of Marshall County. I-22/US 78 bypasses the city to the southwest; exits 26 (Landfill Road) and 30 (MS 4/MS 7) provide access to the city. Continuing southeastward, the freeway than passes through the Holly Springs National Forest and into Benton County passing near several small towns that are accessible through interchanges with or connecting to MS 178. Upon exiting the forest into Union County, I-22/US 78 approaches the county seat of New Albany before passing just southwest of it with four exits (60, 61, 63, and 64) providing direct access to the city. MS 30 shares a brief concurrency with I-22/US 78 between exits 61 and 64 with the latter exit being at MS 15. To the southeast of the city near the town of Sherman in Pontotoc County, I-22/US 78 has a second brief concurrency with MS 9 starting between the exits 73 and 76. I-22/US 78 then enters Lee County and passes north of Tupelo, its county seat, with five exits (81, 82, 85, 86, and 87) connecting to the city, including an interchange with MS 178 (exit 81) northwest of Tupelo along with interchanges with the Natchez Trace Parkway (exit 85) and US 45/Corridor V (exit 86) north of the city with Corridor V becoming concurrent with I-22/US 78. The freeway then turns eastward and has an interchange with MS 371 north of Mooreville before crossing into Itawamba County. I-22/US 78/Corridor V then has an interchange with MS 178 (to MS 363) in Peppertown before crossing the Tennessee–Tombigbee Waterway to its next interchange with South Adams Street (exit 104), which provides access to the community of Fulton, the county seat. MS 25 becomes concurrent with I-22/US 78/Corridor V and heads eastward along the route at the exit as well. A weigh station is also just beyond the exit. One exit later (108), MS 25 and Corridor V branch off and head northward. I-22/US 78 then turns east-southeastward with one final interchange (exit 113) with MS 23 south of Tremont before crossing into Alabama.

Alabama

Still a four-lane freeway, I-22/US 78 (internally designated as AL 4) enters into northwestern Alabama northwest of Bexar in Marion County and heads east-southeastward. It first interchange (exit 3) is located just east of town at County Road 33. I-22/US 78/SR 4's next four exits (7, 11, 14, and 16) serve the city of Hamilton, the county seat. The freeway curls around the southwest side of the city. Exit 7 gives I-22/US 78/SR 4 access to SR 19 and SR 74, exit 11 is an interchange with AL 17 and exit 16 is an interchange with US 43/US 278/SR 171. The final exit also provides access to the community of Guin. I-22/US 78 then passes south of Brilliant which is accessible by interchanges with SR 44 (exit 26, which also serves the town of Twin and the city of Guin) and SR 129 (exit 30, which also serves the community of Winfield). An interchange with SR 233 (exit 34) serves the community of Glen Allen before I-22/US 78/SR 4 crosses into Walker County. Its next interchange, SR 13 (exit 39), serves the communities of Eldridge and Natural Bridge. Carbon Hill is served by County Road 11 (exit 46, which also serves Nauvoo) and SR 118 (exit 52; former Alternate US 78). I-22/US 78/SR 4 then widens to six lanes and has an unsigned interchange (exit 53) with future SR 102. I-22/US 78/SR 4 then passes just south of Jasper, the county seat, which is served by four exits (57, 61, 63, and 65) with SR 118, SR 69, SR 269, and Industrial Parkway. The freeway narrows to four lanes at exit 57, but expands back to six lanes at exit 63. The next three exits (70, 72, and 78) serve Cordova, Parrish, Dora, Sumiton, Wyatt, and Quinton. I-22/US 78/SR 4 then enters Jefferson County and has an interchange with County Road 45 (exit 81), which serves West Jefferson. Its next interchange is with SR 5 (exit 85); the exit marks the end of the concurrency with US 78/SR 4 which branches off and becomes concurrent with SR 5 south, which serves as a local road for Graysville and the northwestern suburbs of Birmingham. Between exit 85 and 87 (CR 112) is the future site of the interchange with I-222 (exit 86), which would connect I-22 to the proposed I-422 (Corridor X-1/Birmingham Northern Beltline). However, an additional interchange (future exit 95C) just beyond I-65 to US 31 is currently under construction.

History
The concept of a Memphis-to-Birmingham expressway was discussed as early as the 1950s but did not move beyond talk for more than 20 years.

When studies for I-22 began, the highway was proposed to continue west to downtown Memphis, Tennessee, and end at I-240 and I-69. Several other proposals were also considered. One took I-22 along I-269 to I-55/I-69 and another took it along Crump Boulevard to end at I-55, but those plans never materialized.

The part of I-22 just east of Fulton, Mississippi, was approved by Congress as "Corridor X" in 1978, as a part of the ADHS, and parts of I-22 have been under construction ever since. Corridor X was also designated as "High Priority Corridor 10" in the federal National Highway System Designation Act of 1995 and as "High Priority Corridor 45" in later legislation. Over the many years of development, the project changed multiple times.

In 2004, Corridor X was designated as Future I-22 by Public Law Number 108-199, and the designation was made official on April 18, 2005. In Alabama and Mississippi, blue signs reading "FUTURE/I-22/CORRIDOR" at left and an I-22 shield with "FUTURE" instead of "INTERSTATE" at the right were unveiled on April 18, 2005.

The first major completed section of the route between the Mississippi state line and Jasper was opened to traffic on November 22, 2005. Exits on the Jasper Bypass portion of I-22 were originally numbered using a kilometer-based sequence because, at the time this stretch was opened, it appeared that all highways in the US were going to be measured using the metric system. The final decision was made to remain using miles, and they have been renumbered according to the highway's mileposts. A  segment between Graysville and Brookside was opened in June 2007, and another  section of Future I-22 between Jasper and Graysville was opened in November 2007. A  segment between Cherry Avenue in Forestdale to a point about  short of I-65 near Fultondale, including an interchange with Coalburg Road, was opened in December 2009. Next came the connection of I-22 with I-65 and US 31. The Alabama Department of Transportation (ALDOT) widened Coalburg Road from its interchange with I-22 southward to Daniel Payne Drive (which leads to I-65) to allow heavy trucks to use it; this project was nearly complete as of May 2015. Signs are now in place on Daniel Payne Drive (westbound) informing truckers that access to I-22 is not allowed from Daniel Payne Drive.

ALDOT was to award contracts in August 2009 for the construction of the final segment of I-22, including its large interchange with I-65 and US 31, with the construction to begin shortly afterward. Funding delays postponed these into 2010, however. On March 19, 2010, President Barack Obama signed the Hiring Incentives to Restore Employment Act (HIRE Act) into law, which included an extension of federal highway funding through the end of 2010. This extension gave the ALDOT the opportunity to proceed with its plans for the construction of final segment of I-22 in Alabama. The opening of the bids for this project began on May 21, 2010. ALDOT announced on June 16, 2010, that the project has been awarded to the company Archer Western Contractors for $168.6 million (equivalent to $ in ). The project is the most expensive highway project ever undertaken in Jefferson County, and it is the highest-priced contract awarded by the ALDOT .

On November 12, 2012, ALDOT's application for establishing I-22 was conditionally approved by the American Association of State Highway and Transportation Officials (AASHTO) at a special committee, pending for the Mississippi Department of Transportation (MDOT) to submit their own application for I-22 and Federal Highway Administration (FHWA) approval. This therefore officially established the existence of I-22.

In April 2013, the first actual I-22 shields were deployed in Marion County, Alabama, immediately east of the Mississippi state line. Such signs will extend east at least through Walker County into the outskirts of Birmingham. On August 21, 2014, ALDOT reported that I-22's interchange with I-65 would not be completed until October 2015. The interchange's connections via exit 95 to I-65 and the continuation under I-65 as exit 95C at US 31 remained under construction. In March 2016, the interchange with I-65 and continuation to US 31 was still under construction. New lanes north and southbound were opened on I-65 passing through the interchange and construction and painting operations were carried out on the I-22 entrance and exit ramps. The interchange to I-65 opened to traffic on June 20, 2016, while the connector to US 31 remained under construction.

Mississippi officials announced May 5, 2015, that the state officially began the process to designate its portion as I-22. The two requirements to be able to apply for this designation were to upgrade the route to Interstate standards and to connect to an existing Interstate within 25 years; this was completed when I-269 was opened in December 2017. The I-65 interchange was opened in October 2015. The route was officially signed in Mississippi in a ceremony on October 23, 2015.

Exit list

Auxiliary routes

Interstate 222

Interstate 222 (I-222) is a future auxiliary Interstate Highway that will be a connector between I-22 and the proposed I-422 near Birmingham, Alabama. There will be no exits other than its terminuses. The highway has been proposed because an interchange directly between I-22 and I-422 cannot be built because of environmental issues. AASHTO approved the designation on May 18, 2012. Construction on this new route has not been scheduled at this time.

Interstate 422

I-422 is a future northwestern bypass of Birmingham, connecting between I-20/I-59 from the southwest and I-59 in the northeast. It will also be connected with I-22 via I-222 in Brookside, located northwest of Birmingham. It was first proposed in May 2009 by US Representative Spencer Bachus; on May 18, 2012, it was approved by AASHTO.

See also

References

External links

 Interstate Guide Profile for Interstate 22
 Alabama Engineering Hall of Fame INTERSTATE-22 (CORRIDOR X)

X
22
22
Transportation in DeSoto County, Mississippi
Transportation in Marshall County, Mississippi
Transportation in Benton County, Mississippi
Transportation in Union County, Mississippi
Transportation in Pontotoc County, Mississippi
Transportation in Lee County, Mississippi
Transportation in Itawamba County, Mississippi
Transportation in Marion County, Alabama
Transportation in Walker County, Alabama
Transportation in Jefferson County, Alabama